"Can You Feel It" is a song by Australian recording artist Timomatic, released digitally on 22 June 2012, as the third single from his self-titled second studio album. The song was produced by Nic Martin and co-written by Matt Cenere. "Can You Feel It" peaked at number 18 on the ARIA Singles Chart and was certified Platinum by the Australian Recording Industry Association.

Background and composition
During an interview with the Australian Associated Press, Timomatic described "Can You Feel It" as an "upbeat single" which he feels is his "strongest" to-date. He went on to say that it has "more of the futuristic edge than 'Set It Off'", the singer's previous single.

Track listing
Digital download
"Can You Feel It" – 3:16

Charts

Weekly charts

Year-end charts

Certifications

Release history

References

2012 songs
2012 singles
Timomatic songs
Sony Music Australia singles